The fifth edition of the Madrid Challenge by La Vuelta, a women's cycling race held in Spain, will take place on 14 and 15 September 2019.

Route and organization 
The race starts with and 9.3 km individual time trial in Boadilla del Monte, followed by a 98.6 km crit race in Madrid. Stage 2 will use the finishing circuit that will also be used for stage 21 of the 2019 Vuelta.

The event was organised by ASO, which also organises the Vuelta a España. It was the 22nd race of the 2019 UCI Women's World Tour.

Results 

|-

See also
 2019 in women's road cycling

References

External links
 

2019 UCI Women's World Tour
2019
2019 in Spanish sport
Madrid Challenge